Cary Brown is the current Executive Director of the Vermont Commission on Women, a non-partisan state agency advancing rights and opportunities for women and girls.

Career
Brown served two terms as a VCW commissioner before joining being appointed Director in October 2012.  Prior to this role, she was the Director of Girls’ Programs for Vermont Works for Women, a non-profit organization supporting education and job training in non-traditional fields for women and girls, directed the Women in Technology Project at Vermont Technical College, and served as the Internship Coordinator at Norwich University.

During her tenure, Brown has shifted the focus of the commission from being an informational resource to more active promotion of women's economic issues, including the promotion of an equal pay compact adopted by more than 100 employers, programs promoting flexible work opportunities for women, and workplace pregnancy accommodations. The commission serves as an information and research resource for the Vermont legislature on issues such as paid family leave. Under Brown the VCW, in collaboration with Vermont Works for Women and the Vermont Women's Fund, co-launched the Change the Story project which promotes and supports women's economic security.

Elected positions 
Brown also serves as an elected Justice of the peace in Montpelier, Vermont, and in 2022 she was elected to the Montpelier city council.

Education
Brown has a Bachelor’s degree from Haverford College and a Master of Public Administration degree from Norwich University.

References

Living people
Women in Vermont politics
Haverford College alumni
Norwich University alumni
American feminists
Year of birth missing (living people)
21st-century American women